Area-7 (also known as Area 7) are an Australian ska punk band. Formed in Melbourne in 1994, they have released four studio albums, No Logic!, Bitter & Twisted,  Say It To My Face and  Torn Apart. At the ARIA Music Awards of 2000, Bitter & Twisted was nominated for ARIA Award for Best Rock Album.

History 
Area-7 formed in 1994 from the ashes of Madness cover band Mad Not Madness. In 1994 three members, Dugald "Doogs" McNaughtan (keyboards), Charles "Chucky T" Thompson (guitar) and Dan Morrison (drums) left the group and began to write their own songs. In 1994, Area-7 self-released a cassette titled Demo Tape 1994 featuring 4 tracks. Alistair Shepherd (sax), Toby Dargaville (trumpet) and Rohan Pacey (bass) joined in 1995 and the same year released their debut studio album No Logic. 

In 2000, the group released Bitter & Twisted, which at the ARIA Music Awards of 2000 was nominated for ARIA Award for Best Rock Album.

In October 2001, the group released Say It to My Face which peaked at number 36 on the ARIA charts.

Whilst AREA-7 has never "officially split", since 2005 the band has been playing "when they feel like it" or as they put it, "for special occasions". 

Drummer and founding member Dan Morrison died on 1 December 2020.

Discography

Albums

Extended plays

Singles

References

External links 
Area-7 on Facebook
 
 

Australian punk rock groups
Musical groups established in 1994
1994 establishments in Australia
Third-wave ska groups
Musical groups from Melbourne
Australian ska groups